The Warsaw rectifier is a pulse-width modulation (PWM) rectifier, invented by Włodzimierz Koczara in 1992.

Features
The Warsaw Rectifier provides following features:
 Unity power factor   
 Three-wire input, does not require connection to the neutral wire
 Ohmic behaviour
 Controlled output voltage 
 Simple control scheme
 Low power losses

Unique features of the Warsaw Rectifier:
 Short circuits do not cause current flow through switches
 No cross short circuit of switches possible 
 Dead time not required

Topology
Warsaw Rectifier is a unidirectional, three-phase, three-switch two-level PWM rectifier. This topology uses three transistors and eighteen diodes. The bidirectional switches (made as four diodes and one transistor circuit) are connected in a delta topology. The rectifier output does not require a divided DC-link circuit as in the Vienna Rectifier topology.

See also
Vienna rectifier

References

Electronic circuits
Rectifiers